Aliyu Abubakar Aziz is a chartered engineer with over 30 years post-qualification experience in information technology, management, and administration. He is the current Director General and Chief Executive Officer of Nigeria's National Identity Management Commission (NIMC). He had previously worked with some of the most progressive Government Institutions in Nigeria during their transformative years.

Aziz is a graduate of Ahmadu Bello University, Zaria where he received a B.Eng in Civil Engineering and an M.Sc. in Structural Engineering with specialty in Computer-aided design. He started his working career as a Graduate Assistant in the Civil Engineering Department of the university. He went on to become a Principal Partner of Integrated Engineering Associates (IEA), where he designed and supervised several prominent buildings and bridges in Kaduna and Abuja environs, including NUC Secretariat, PHCN Headquarters, AP Plaza, NACB Office block, and Nigeria Ports Authority Headquarters. and many others. He has served as consultant for numerous public and private sector organizations on Engineering and Information Technology issues including Afri Projects Consortium, National Poverty Alleviation Programme and the Nigeria Police.

He has developed several software applications for Finite Element structural analysis and design of reinforced concrete pad footings, hollow clay pots, wind analysis of multi-storey buildings, analysis and design of two-way solid slabs, and design of sections. He is proficient in countless high level programming languages including BASIC, FORTRAN, APL, C++, LISP, TCL/TK, PYTHON, and currently engaged with JAVA on the client side and PHP on the server side.

He retired as the Director of Information Technology and Identity Database Department in the National Identity Management Commission before his appointment as the Director General and Chief Executive Officer. He also served as the Information Technology Adviser to the Minister, Federal Capital Territory Administration, where he pioneered the implementation of the first e-government solution that won a Microsoft award in 2006. He was also the Technical Chairman on the Presidential Committee on Harmonization of ICT that resulted in the formation of Galaxy Backbone Limited. He was Deputy Director, Information Technology with the Bureau of Public Enterprises that restructured and executed the Nigerian Government's privatization policy.  He also served as a Director in the Secretariat of the Presidential Implementation Committee on the Implementation of Government Decisions on Consumer Credit System, National Outsourcing Initiative and Harmonization of Identification Schemes in Nigeria.

Prior to joining government, he was a Principal Consultant, Management Information System Department, Afri-Projects Consortium, an indigenous management consulting firm that won one of the largest consultancy projects in Nigeria. A tutor and specialist in engineering, he teaches engineering students online via www.aliyuaziz.com in the Engineering Faculty of Ahmadu Bello University, Zaria and ACEN Training School, Abuja.

Aziz is a fellow of the Nigeria Institution of Structural Engineers where is the current National Vice president and also holds membership of several professional bodies including Nigerian Society of Engineers (NSE), American Society of Mechanical Engineers, Computer Association of Nigeria and the Internet Society. He is widely travelled and an alumnus of the Harvard, Stanford, IMD and Lagos Business Schools.

Early life and education 
Aziz was born in Gembu, Mambilla Plateau area of Taraba State, Nigeria. He received early education at Ganye 1 Primary School and Government Secondary School Ganye, Adamawa State. He enrolled into the School of Basic Studies Zaria where he obtained ‘A’ level qualification before moving to Ahmadu Bello University Zaria, Kaduna state to study Civil Engineering. He graduated with a B.Eng. in Civil Engineering with Second Class Upper Division in 1983. In 1985 he earned NCC Certificate of System Analysis and Design and later pursured an M.Sc. in Structural Engineering, at Ahmadu Bello University, Zaria where he graduated in 1987.  Aziz is currently pursuing a PhD in Reliability of Offshore Structures at the Federal University of Technology, Akure, Ondo State, Nigeria.

Aziz is an alumnus of Harvard and Stanford universities, IMD, and Lagos Business School, where he obtained several specialized trainings and certifications in several fields, at International Business Schools and Engineering Firms in Sweden, Switzerland, South Africa, UK, USA, Australia, Nigeria, etc. and currently online. Some of his professional trainings include:

 System Analysis and Design Certificate (1985), Zaria
 Computerized Project Management (1996), Lagos
 Project Planning, Scheduling and Implementation (1998), Abuja
 Intranet Planning and Development ISOC'1998, Geneva
 Cryptography and Network Security ISOC'1999, San Jose
 Accounting for Non-Accountants, LBS'2000, Lagos
 Entrepreneurship, LBS'2001, Lagos
 eBusiness Planning and Development ISOC'2001, Stockholm
 Java and XML, ISOC'2001, Stockholm
 Lotus eGovernment Global Forum (2002), London
 Domino Designer Fundamentals (2002), South Africa
 Maintaining Domino Users (2002), South Africa
 Maintaining a Domino Server Infrastructure (2002), South Africa
 Intro to Domino.Doc 3.0, (2002), South Africa
 Domino.Doc 3.0 System Administration (2002), South Africa
 Developing Applications using Lotus Workflow 3.0, (2002), South Africa
 Help Desk Support (2002), South Africa
 Network Security I: Policy, Administration and Firewalls (2002), New York
 Network Security II: Integration and Implementation (2002), New York 
 Managing Cisco Network Security MCNS, (2002), Boston
 Delivering Information Services, Harvard Business School, (2003), Boston 
 VSAT Installation, Operation, Technology and Maintenance Workshop (2003), Ibadan 
 IBM eServer, pSeries, GRID & Linux Technical University, (2003), Sydney 
 Autodesk Revit 7 Essentials, (2005), Abuja
 LS-DYNA, Advanced Impact Analysis, Over Arup & Partners, Solihull, UK (2006)
 LS-DYNA, Implicit Nonlinear Finite Element (FE) Analysis, Over Arup & Partners, Solihull, UK (2006) 
 LS-OPT, Optimization and Reliability Analysis in Finite Element Analysis of nonlinear structures, Livermore, CA, USA (2007)
 Strategic Uses of Information Technology, Stanford University, Palo Alto, CA, USA (2007)
 Mastering Strategy, Lagos Business School, Lagos, Nigeria (2007)
 Turning Strategy into Action, Lagos Business School, Lagos, Nigeria (2007)
 Concrete & Geomaterial Modelling with LS-DYNA, Alyotech, Velizy, Paris (2008)
 LS-DYNA Modelling and Simulation of Blast & Penetration, Alyotech, Velizy, Paris (2008)
 Optimization with LS-OPT, Over Arup & Partners, Solihull, UK (2008)
 Stochastic Analysis with LS-OPT, Arup & Partners, Solihull, UK (2008)
 Nonlinear Finite Element Analysis, Institute for Computational Engineering, Austin, Texas, USA (2009)
 ANSYS AQWA Hydrodynamic Analysis for wave diffraction and radiation, ANSYS Horsham, UK (2009)
 ANSYS ASAS-OFFSHORE General finite element analysis with automated generation of wave loads; soil-structure interaction; combined with ultimate and serviceability limit strength design assessments and spectral fatigue, ANSYS Horsham, UK (2009)
 Executive Program in Strategy and Organization, Stanford University, Palo Alto, CA, USA (2010)
 Structural Optimization in FE Analysis – el013, National Agency for Finite Element Methods and Standards (NAFEMS) e-Learning, October 2010
 Dynamic FE Analysis – el015, NAFEMS e-Learning, December 2010
 Non-linear FE Analysis – el014, NAFEMS e-Learning, February 2011
 Composite FE Analysis – el016, NAFEMS e-Learning, April 2011
 Basic FE Analysis – el020, NAFEMS e-Learning, May 2011
 Practical Introduction to Computational Fluid Dynamics (CFD) – el027, NAFEMS e-Learning, October 2011
 Essentials of Fluid Mechanics – el033, NAFEMS e-Learning, December 2011
 NVH & Frequency Domain Analysis in LS-DYNA, Over Arup & Partners, Solihull, UK 2013
 Certified Data Centre Management Professional (CDCMP®), C-Net, London, UK 2013
 Breakthrough for Senior Executive, IMD Lausanne,  Switzerland, 2014 and many more.

Engineering and Information Technology Career 
Aziz started his engineering career in the Public Institution as a graduate assistant in the civil engineering department of Ahmadu Bello University, Zaria. In 1987,  Aziz left ABU Zaria to join a private firm, Mai and Associates as a Pupil Engineer and rose to the rank of Project Engineer.

After leaving Mai and Associates,  Aziz joined a group of friends in 1992 to found an engineering firm, Integrated Engineering Associates, and became a principal partner responsible for computer applications for structural engineering design and drafting.  Aziz was credited for designing customized computer programmes such as spreadsheets, database, AutoCAD, AutoLISP and management information systems for the exclusive use of the firm.  Aziz is a computer programmer and writes in several programming languages including BASIC, FORTRAN, APL, C++, Lisp, Java, Python and R.

Aziz then became a principal consultant on a joint venture partnership with Afri-Projects Consortium, consulting for the Petroleum Trust Fund, an agency of the Government of Nigeria and was the head of the Management Information Systems Department. There, he oversaw all computer and database-related activities in the organization. In 2000, Petroleum Trust Fund was dissolved and Afri-Projects Consortium's consultancy contract was terminated.  Aziz left the firm and founded Integrated Systems Solution Limited, which focused on rendering information technology solutions. He was a consulting engineer on high-profile projects including:

In 2002, Aziz joined the Bureau of Public Enterprises as deputy director in charge of information technology with the task of formulating the agency's information technology strategy, frameworks and implementation for a successful overhaul of government's privatization policy.  Aziz provided vision and leadership for developing and implementing information technology initiatives. He combined IT leadership with oversight on the management of all IT planning and implementation by ensuring the preparation of operational and strategic objectives and budgets. He also coordinated, directed and developed IT frameworks, policies and procedures for the bureau and assisted in the organizational restructuring activities of priority sectors/departments of Government.

In 2006, Aziz was appointed as Information Technology Adviser to the Minister of Nigeria's Federal Capital Territory, Nasir Elrufai.  He initiated the e-government system in the FCT ministry, which won a Microsoft award in 2006.  Aziz was also a director in the office of the Secretary to the Government of the Federation where he served in the Presidential Implementation Committee, charged with implementing Government Decisions on Consumer Credit System, National Outsourcing Initiative and Harmonization of Identification Schemes in Nigeria. The committee oversaw the setting up of the National Identity Management Commission in 2007.  Aziz later became a pioneer staff of the commission and rose to the rank of Directorof Information Technology/Identity Database, a position he held until his retirement in 2014.

National Identity Management Commission 
In November 2015,  Aziz was appointed director general and chief executive officer of Nigeria's National Identity Management Commission by President Muhammadu Buhari for a four-year term. In 2019, he was re-appointed for a second term.

In April 2019, Aziz obtained, the highest global standards of Information Security Management System for the commission, in its determination to ensure the security of citizen's data. In March 2019  Aziz announced that the commission was opening enrollment centers in foreign countries to enroll Nigerians in Diaspora into the National Identity Database (NIDB).

Aziz is on a mission to ensure that all Nigerians and legal residents are issued unique digital identities. During his first tenure, the commission made great strides even though it faced and still faces challenges. Some of the achievements can be seen in the following areas:

Enrollment 

 Increase in enrolment records from 7 million in 2015 to 41.6 million in Q1 2020.
 Harmonization of 11 million BVN records.
 Commenced enrolment in Borno and Yobe States.
 Commenced enrolment of minors (children under the age of 16 years).
 Diaspora enrolment in 22 countries across 5 continents (UAE, UK, USA, India and South Africa, Austria, China, Saudi Arabia, Benin Republic).
 Increase in enrolment centers from 431 in 2015 to about 1100 in 2020.

Back-end infrastructure upgrade 

 Upgrade of Automated Biometric Identification System to the latest technology (MORPHO BSS)
 ISO re-certification (2016, 2017, 2018 and 2019)
 Deployment of USSD Code *346# for NIN retrieval.
 Roll out of API for verification and enrolment, consumed by about 30 government agencies so far.
 NIN Tokenization

Ecosystem approach 

 Federal Executive Council approval for the implementation of the strategic roadmap for digital identity ecosystem in Nigeria, through the development partners funding (World Bank, Agence Francaise de Développement and European Union).
 Advertised for data capture license on the digital ID with evaluation ongoing.

Collaborations 

 Collaboration with Nigeria Immigration Services – PKI & Embossed NIN on the Nigerian Passport.
 Collaboration with Kaduna State Government on Residency Card, likewise with Lagos, Kano and Delta States
 Collaboration with PenCom, NHIS, NCC, CAC, FIRS/JTB and INEC
 Collaboration with the Nigerian Postal Service on digital addressing system.
 Collaboration with UNHCR on IDP registration in Borno State
 Collaboration with UN Women in Kaduna State.
 Collaboration with Gombe State Government on NIN verification for Civil Servants.
 Collaborations with Banks, PFAs, and other private sector institutions to increase enrolment

Publicity/awareness 

 Strategic partnership with NOA, FRCN, NAN, and NTA on grass root sensitization on NIMS project.

Federal government intervention 

 Hosted ID4AFRICA Conference in Nigeria in 2018.
 Federal Executive Council - FEC approval for the implementation of the mandatory use of NIN as a valid means of identification.

Regulations 
Gazette of five NIMC Regulations:

 Licensing of the Frontend Services of the NIMC Act 2017
 Mandatory use of the National Identification Number Regulations 2017
 Nigeria Biometrics Standard Regulations 2017
 Registration of Persons and Contents of the NIDB Regulations 2017
 Access to Registered Information in the NIDB Regulations 2017

Infrastructure 

 Construction of Two (2) NIMC State Offices in Abakaliki and Katsina.
 Rehabilitation of 10 NIMC State Offices across the Six (6) geopolitical zones of the country. Kano, Sokoto, Enugu, Rivers, Kwara, Benue, Adamawa, Taraba, Ondo, and Oyo state offices.
 Rehabilitation of the:

 Headquarters Administration Block
 Bungalow
 Headquarters Cafeteria
 Numerization building, now known as Ecosystem Centre
 Training Centre and Biometrics
 Fortification of the perimeter fence with electric and barbed wire
 Headquarters Enrolment Centre
 Kaduna Enrolment & Training Centre buildings
 Enhanced CCTV to monitor the external environment of the HQ

 Procurement and installation of Two (2) 250KVA stabilizers in the HQ to ensure the supply of clean and uninterrupted power supply to the Datacenter. This has reduced the consumption of Diesel by about 60% with plans of a further slash to less than 5% using the MG System and Autonomous Power Systems.
 Network upgrade of HQ Connectivity and Datacenter being carried out by GBB which is about 90% complete
 Procurement of sundry enrollment equipment and peripherals including but not limited to:

 138 KA Bands + 1-year subscription.
 138 all in one Enrollment systems.
 138 4-4-2 Fingerprint Scanners.
 138 Printers and Scanners.
 Assorted furniture for staff in HQ and States.
 2 X 360 KVA Generators for HQ.
 Upgrade of Communication Facilities in the Director General's Office, Conference and Board Rooms.
 Procurement of Fifteen (15) Project Vehicles to enhance project delivery.

Other Developments 

 NIMC nominated on the Board of Open Standards Identity API (OSIA)
 DG NIMC appointed as the first Chairman of OSIA in June 2019
 DG NIMC appointed as the ID4Africa Ambassador

Professional Publications 
Engr. Aziz has published and presented many professional papers. Some professional titles include:

 Challenges of the 21st Century and Strategic Tools for the Catalyst, Presentation at National Conference, Lagos for Association of Consulting Engineers (ACEN), November 2000.
 Intranet Development in a Project-based Enterprise, International Internet Conference ISOC (Nig) '99 for Internet Society, Nigerian chapter, January 1999.
 Repositioning the Consulting Engineer in the Third Millennium, PowerPoint Presentation at the National Conference of the Association of Consulting Engineers (ACEN), November 1999.
 Analysis and Design of Solid Slabs to BS8110, Spreadsheet Topics on Computerized Design Office Practice, Workshop for Nigerian Society of Engineers, February, 1995.
 AutoCAD - based Structural Drafting, Detailing and Bending Schedules Preparations, New Techniques and Practices in Structural Design Workshop for Nigerian Society of Engineers, September, 1994.
 Computer Assisted Civil Engineering Education at Ahmadu Bello University at the 1st National Conference on Computer Applications, February 1985 (Co-authored with Abatan, A.O.)
 Software Development in Structural Engineering via Systems modelling, at the International Conference on the Theory, Methods and Practice of Programming by the Computer Association of Nigeria (CAON) April 1985 (Co-authored with Abatan, A.O.)
 Damage Detection in a Structural Frame via System Identification Techniques for Structural Health Monitoring System, The Nigerian Institution of Structural Engineers, National Conference, Sheraton Hotel, Abuja - October 2015

References 

1962 births
Living people
Nigerian engineers
Nigerian civil servants